Xavier Ipharraguerre (born 3 September 1975) is a French former professional footballer who played as a forward. He played in Division 2 for Niort.

References

1975 births
Living people
Sportspeople from Bayonne
French footballers
Association football forwards
FC Girondins de Bordeaux players
Toulouse FC players
Chamois Niortais F.C. players
Pau FC players
Aviron Bayonnais FC players
Ligue 2 players
French-Basque people
Footballers from Nouvelle-Aquitaine